Route 215-CH is a branch line road going eastward from Osorno at Chile Highway 5 to Cardenal Antonio Samoré Pass at the border to Argentina. Apart from connecting southern Chile with Argentina, the road is also the main access to Antillanca ski resort, Puyehue National Park and the hot springs of Puyehue and Aguas Calientes.

See also
Route U-40

Roads in Chile
Transport in Los Lagos Region